The Capture of Geertruidenberg of 1589, also known as the English betrayal of Geertruidenberg, took place on April 10, 1589, at Geertruidenberg, Duchy of Brabant, Flanders (present-day the Netherlands), during the Eighty Years' War and the Anglo-Spanish War (1585–1604).

Events 
On April 10, 1589, the garrison of Geertruidenberg, composed of numerous English and some Dutch troops commanded by Governor Sir John Wingfield, surrendered the city to the Army of Flanders led by Don Alexander Farnese, Governor-General of the Spanish Netherlands. A few days before, when pay did not arrive in time, the English soldiers mutinied, and was rumored that Wingfield had intended to surrender (or "sold") the city to the Spaniards. The States-General and Prince Maurice of Nassau accused him of treason for its surrender, but Wingfield denied the charges against him. The fact was that Geertruidenberg was in Spanish hands.

The same year, in September, Parma sent a force under Count Peter Ernst of Mansfeld to besiege Rheinberg.  The garrison capitulated to the Spaniards in February 1590.

Geertruidenberg was recaptured in June 1593 by an Anglo-Dutch force under the command of Maurice of Nassau and Francis Vere respectively.

See also
 Siege of Bergen op Zoom (1588)
 Siege of Rheinberg (1586–1590)
 Sir William Stanley
 Rowland York
 Spanish Army of Flanders
 List of Governors of the Spanish Netherlands

Notes

References
 Jeremy Black. War in the World: A Comparative History, 1450-1600. First published 2011 by Palgrave MacMillan. 
 Mary Arshagouni Papazian. John Donne and the Protestant Reformation: New Perspectives. Wayne State University Press 2003.
 John Leslie Price. Dutch Society: 1588-1713. First published 2000 by Pearson Education Limited, USA. 
 Israel, Jonathan. Conflicts of Empires: Spain, the Low Countries and the Struggle for World Supremacy, 1585-1713.  London, 1997. 
 Luc Duerloo. Dynasty and Piety: Archduke Albert (1598-1621) and Habsburg Political Culture in an Age of Religious Wars. MPG Books Group. UK.

External links
 Jeremy Black. War in the World: A Comparative History, 1450-1600. Wars of Religion.

Geertruidenberg
1589 in the Dutch Republic
1589 in the Habsburg Netherlands
16th-century military history of the Kingdom of England
16th-century military history of Spain
Geertruidenberg (1589)
Eighty Years' War (1566–1609)
Geertruidenberg (1589)
Geertruidenberg (1589)
Geertruidenberg (1589)
Geertruidenberg (1589)
Geertruidenberg
Geertruidenberg